In linguistics, andative and venitive (abbreviated  and ) are a type of verbal deixis: verb forms which indicate 'going' or 'coming' motion, respectively, in reference to a particular location or person. Other terms sometimes seen are itive and ventive, or translocative and cislocative. They generally derive historically from the verbs go and come being reduced to auxiliary verbs or verbal affixes, and may in turn be grammaticalized to aspectual morphemes. Many languages of Siberia (such as Itelmen, Forest Nenets, Chukchi, Alyutor), California, West Africa (such as Akan), the Caucasus-Mideast-North Africa (Akkadian, Sumerian), and Oceania have such verb forms.

A language with andative and venitive forms may also use them with a verb to carry, for example, to create the meanings of "bring" (venitive) and "take (away)" (andative).

Lithuanian
The Lithuanian language marks direction towards and away from the deictic centre when movement verbs are used much alike, but even more so, than Slavic languages. This makes up a very important part of Lithuanian grammar, as it is added to many of the most used verbs (movement verbs). In the general sense, the proclitic "at" shows movement towards the listener or the deictic centre and "iš" shows movement from or away from it.

As it can be understood from the examples, the particles "at" and "iš" help Lithuanians specify the relation of the movement intended with the deictic centre. As a result of this, different nuances can be obtained from not using these particles, similar to the feeling provided in English by using "I will go to you" vs "I will come to you".

Several other verbs which can and do use these particles are: eiti (to go by foot), nešti (to carry), skristi (to fly), vairuoti (to pilot, to drive), etc.

Nonetheless, the meanings of these directional particles have widened over time to the point that they bring a different shade of meaning but related to the concept they originally stood for. And this has happened with many other Lithuanian prepositions and prefixes; remarkable is the drift suffered by positional prepositions, which are now also used to express cause in a genuine system which is both complex and unique to the Lithuanian language, and about which comprehensive information can be found at: http://www.lituanus.org/1999/99_1_07.htm.

To provide an example, the meaning of "at" is very likely derived from its Indo-European origin in the particle *ád|, meaning "near, at".
As a result of this, this prefix can be used in a derivative way in order to create a new word with a different meaning from an existing word. The meaning of this new word could be more or less similar to that of the original term. Thus, from the verb "pažinti" (to know (as in a person or a fact)), we get "atpažinti" (to tell apart, to know which one it is (from a group)).

Polynesian
Proto-Polynesian is reconstructed as having four directional particles used for verbs: venitive *mai, andative *atu, upwards (uphill, inland) *hake, and downwards (downhill, seawards) *hifo.

The Vanuatu language Lenakel has not only a venitive suffix, but also a suffix that indicates that the action is directed towards the person addressed, as well as a neutral suffix that indicates that the action is directed neither towards the speaker nor towards the person addressed.

Sumerian
While the so-called conjugational prefixes of Sumerian have been interpreted in different ways, one of the most common views involves the following analysis:

But:

(*) The prefix ì- has no grammatical or lexical meaning. It is used, because each finite verb form must have at least one prefix.

The venitive prefix is also frequently used with verbs that do not express a movement:

Currently, sumerologists use the variant term ventive rather than venitive.

Karajá 
Karajá, a Macro-Jê language of central Brazil, is unusual in requiring all verbs to be inflected for direction, whether they semantically imply motion or not. Two mutually-exclusive directions are marked in Karajá verbal inflection: "centrifugal" (away from the speaker or topic), indicated by the prefix d-; and "centripetal" (toward the speaker or topic), indicated by the prefix r-. Karajá lacks any verbs of inherent (lexical) direction, like e.g. English come or go; direction marking is entirely dependent on inflection. Examples follow; note that complex morphophonological processes often obscure underlying forms, and that in some verbs - e.g. -lɔ, "to enter" - the centrifugal direction is unmarked.

Since verbs like die obviously cannot encode direction as such, the category of "direction" in Karajá includes various conceptually-related distinctions. Verbs marked as centripetal often convey an emotional relevance to the speaker, whereas verbs marked as centrifugal imply detachment (compare the English metaphor of emotional distance). Similarly, imperatives marked as centripetal such as bədʊnə̃kɛ "sit down!" have a more friendly hortative tone than imperatives marked as centrifugal. Direction marking can also imply a proximate / obviate distinction, especially in narrative texts, where the most salient character or location is chosen as the deictic centre. It can also convey a certain evidential stance, where progressive verbs marked as centripetal imply that the speaker is a direct witness to an ongoing event: nariadɛrɪ "he is walking [I'm witnessing it]", or "look, he's walking".

Notes

References
 Robin Hooper. 2002. Studies in language 26 (2):283–313.
 Edzard, Dietz-Otto: A Sumerian Grammar, Brill Academic Publishers, 2003, .
 Lynch, John: A Grammar of Lenakel. (Pacific Linguistics Series B No. 55) The Australian National University, Canberra 1978.
Ribeiro, Eduardo Revail: A Grammar of Karajá. University of Chicago, Illinois 2012.

Verb types